Ariany may refer to:
Ariany, Spain
Ariany, Poland